National Quemoy University  (NQU) is a national university, located in Jinning Township, Kinmen (Quemoy), Republic of China (Taiwan). NQU offers a variety of academic programs. They are divided into three categories: 1. undergraduate program, 2. graduate program, and 3. continuing education program.

NQU is known for its programs in marine science, engineering, and business, and it has a strong focus on research and innovation.

History
NQU was founded in 1997 in Kinmen as the National Kaohsiung University of Applied Sciences, Kinmen Division. In 2003, it became the National Kinmen Institute of Technology. It was upgraded to National Quemoy University in 2010.

Departments 
 Department of Applied Foreign Languages
 Department of Architecture and Historic Preservation 
 Department of Business Administration 
 Department of Computer Science and Information Engineering 
 Department of Construction Engineering 
 Department of Electronic Engineering 
 Department of Food Science 
 Department of International Affairs
 Department of Sports and Leisure
 Department of Tourism Management
 Graduate Institute of Culture and History of South Fujian
 Graduate Institute of Disaster Prevention and Sustainability
 Graduate Institute of Electrical Engineering and Computer Science
 Graduate Institute of Island Recreation Resources Development
 Graduate Institute of Mainland China Studies
 Graduate Institute of Marine Affairs

See also
 List of universities in Taiwan

References

External links

 Official site

1997 establishments in Taiwan
Educational institutions established in 1997
Jinning Township
Universities and colleges in Kinmen County